Ntombizanele Beauty Sifuba is a South African politician and educator who has been the speaker of the Free State Provincial Legislature since May 2019. She was elected to the legislature in the same month. Sifuba is a member of the African National Congress.

Education
In 1988, Sifuba obtained a bachelor of arts in education from Vista University. From the Central University of Technology, she holds a bachelor of psychology. In 2017, Sifuba attained a postgraduate diploma in governance and political transformation from the University of the Free State. She is currently pursuing a master's degree in the same field.

Career

Teaching career
Sifuba worked as a teacher from 1999 to 2019. She also worked as the deputy director responsible for monitoring and evaluation at the provincial Department of Social Development.

Political career
In 1995, she was elected deputy secretary of the African National Congress in the party's President Steyn region. She also held leadership positions in the South African Democratic Teachers Union. Sifuba was the deputy provincial chairperson of COSATU. Sifuba is currently a member of the ANC's subcommittees on economic development and gender and equity.

In March 2019, Sifuba was placed twelfth on the ANC's provincial list. She was elected as the ANC won 19 seats in the Free State Provincial Legislature. Sifuba was sworn in as an MPL on 22 May 2019. On the same day, she was elected speaker.

Controversy 
In November 2022, Sifuba appeared in a sex tape that was shared widely on social media. Sifuba opened a case against the person who shared the video, while her office did not respond to the video. She refused to identify the person to the police.

References

External links

Living people
Year of birth missing (living people)
Sotho people
African National Congress politicians
Members of the Free State Provincial Legislature
21st-century South African politicians
20th-century South African politicians
South African women in politics